The Third Bardo was an American psychedelic and garage rock band from New York City, New York. Their name is a reference to the book The Tibetan Book of the Dead.

The group existed for a brief time in the late 1960s. In 1967 they released their only single, "I'm Five Years Ahead of My Time", a song co-written by Rusty Evans (a.k.a. Marcus Uzilevsky), a former folk singer and leader of the psychedelic proto-punk band The Deep, and Vicky Pike, the wife of the record's arranger and producer Teddy Randazzo.   "Five Years Ahead of My Time" received some radio exposure until it was pulled for its perceived drug references, and only years later was recognized as a 1960s garage rock classic due to its inclusion in compilations such as the Pebbles garage/psych compilations.

Though short-lived, the band still performed in local Manhattan venues during their existence, including Arthur's Tavern and Ondine. They also appeared on the Cleveland-based television show Upbeat.

The Third Bardo only had one recording session, which yielded six tracks in all including "Rainbow Life" which was released as the b-side to "I'm Five Years Ahead of My Time". Their technique of Eastern melody and distorted guitar made the single distinctive to the rock scene.

The band broke up in 1967, soon after recording, and Jeff Monn began a solo career as Chris Moon. He released an album named The Chris Moon Group in 1970.

Discography

45s
 "I'm Five Years Ahead of My Time" b/w "Rainbow Life" (Roulette 4742) 1967

Albums
 Lose Your Mind (Sundazed SEP 106) 1993
 The Third Bardo (Sundazed SEP 10-160) 2000

Song list
 "I'm Five Years Ahead of My Time"
 "Rainbow Life"
 "Lose Your Mind"
 "I Can Understand Your Problem"
 "Dawn of Tomorrow"

References

 Unterberger, Richie: 

Garage rock groups from New York (state)
Roulette Records artists
Musical groups established in 1967
Musical groups disestablished in 1967
Psychedelic rock music groups from New York (state)